Ruthenbach is a river of North Rhine-Westphalia, Germany. It is a left tributary of the Ems south of Harsewinkel. It should not be confused with the Ruthebach, a tributary of the Loddenbach, which is also officially referred to as Ruthenbach.

See also
List of rivers of North Rhine-Westphalia

Rivers of North Rhine-Westphalia
Rivers of Germany